Massey John Henry Lopes, 4th Baron Roborough (born 22 December 1969) is a British hereditary peer and a Conservative member of the House of Lords.

Lord Roborough became a member of the House in October 2022, after being one of the two winners in a hereditary peers' by-election to replace both the Viscount Ullswater and the Lord Colwyn.

According to his candidate statement, Lord Roborough spent his career in investment banking and management; he is married with five children and divides his time between London and Devon.

References

1969 births
Living people
Conservative Party (UK) hereditary peers
Barons in the Peerage of the United Kingdom
Massey
People educated at Eton College
Alumni of St Cuthbert's Society, Durham
Investment bankers
Hereditary peers elected under the House of Lords Act 1999